Viewers Like You is the fourth and final studio album by Californian punk rock band, Tilt. It was released in August 1999 on Fat Wreck Chords.

Track listing 
All lyrics written by Cinder Block
"Annie Segall" – 2:42    
"Die of Shame" – 2:48    
"War Room" – 2:26    
"Animated Corpse" – 2:44    
"Pontiac" – 2:28    
"Fine Ride" – 3:29     
"Viewers Like You" – 2:41     
"Pious" – 2:23     
"Penny Ante" – 2:16     
"Mama's Little Man" – 2:00     
"Dog Collar" – 1:33     
"Restless Irritable & Discontent" – 2:21     
"Counting" – 2:55     
"Want to Do" – 2:44

Credits 
 Cinder Block – vocals
 Jeffrey Bischoff – guitar
 Jimi Cheetah – bass
 Vincent Camacho – drums
 Recorded March – April, 1999 at Motor Studios, San Francisco, California, US
 Produced by Fat Mike and Ryan Greene
 Engineered by Ryan Greene and Adam Krammer

References

External links 
Fat Wreck Chords album page

1999 albums
Tilt (band) albums
Fat Wreck Chords albums
Albums produced by Ryan Greene